Finding North is a 1998 gay-themed independent comedy-drama film. Written by Kim Powers and directed by Tanya Wexler, the film stars Wendy Makkena and John Benjamin Hickey.

Plot
Finding North tells the story of Rhonda (Makkena), a bank teller who's depressed upon turning 30, and Travis (Hickey), a gay man who's recently lost his lover to AIDS and grown suicidal. Travis receives an audio tape recorded by his lover, Bobby, before his death which sends him on a scavenger hunt of sorts to Bobby's home town in Texas. Through a series of mishaps, Rhonda ends up accompanying him on his journey. Together they follow Bobby's instructions as best they can, collecting items that represent Bobby's past, despite the many changes to the town in the years since Bobby left. Ultimately they end up at the grave site Bobby's parents had prepared for him decades earlier. They bury the collected items at Bobby's instruction and together start to try "finding north" (an expression of Bobby's; "when things hit rock bottom, sure as hell can't get any further south, might as well start finding north").

Cast

Awards and nominations
Verzaubert - International Gay & Lesbian Film Festival Rosebud Award - Best Film (nominated)

DVD release
Finding North was released on Region 1 DVD on March 7, 2000.

External links
 
 

1998 romantic comedy films
1998 LGBT-related films
1998 films
American LGBT-related films
American independent films
Films directed by Tanya Wexler
1990s English-language films
1998 directorial debut films
1990s American films
LGBT-related romantic comedy films